Chao was a minor state of the Chinese Bronze Age, whose people belonged to the Shu tribes (群舒, literally "Many Shu") that lived south of the Huai River. Chao's exact location is unknown; traditionally, it was assumed that the state had existed in the vicinity of modern-day Chaohu, Anhui, but more recent sinologists like He Hao and Barry Blakeley consider it more likely that Chao was located further north, near the Huai River.

History 
According to the Book of Documents, Chao was a satellite of the Shang dynasty until the latter was overthrown by the Zhou dynasty, whereupon Chao voluntarily submitted to King Wu of Zhou around 1040 BCE. A few decades later during the reign of King Kang of Zhou, however, Chao rebelled and attacked Zhou territory. As result, the Zhou king sent the Six Armies of the West under Tung Kung to defeat Chao, though in the end it was the regional lord of E who defeated and captured Chao's rebellious ruler.

Despite this, Chao remained restive, and when a massive war broke out between Xu and the Zhou dynasty in the 940s BCE, the people of Chao sided with Xu against their overlords. This rebellion, too, proved unsuccessful for Chao, and was crushed when the Duke of Mao captured Chao's capital.

After the Zhou dynasty had largely collapsed in the 8th century BCE, Chao became fully independent, but soon came to be threatened by the expansionist state of Chu. Around 600 BCE, Chao and the other Shu states were forced to officially submit to Chu in order to avoid destruction. Nevertheless, the Shu states continued to maintain their desire for independence, which was supported and stirred by Chu's rival, Wu. In response, Chu began to fully conquer them one by one, beginning with Chao, whose fall is dated between 583-575 BCE by He Hao and sometime earlier by Blakeley. Even after the end of its independence, Chao's former capital continued to be a bone of contention between Chu and Wu: King Zhufan of Wu launched an attack on the city in 548 BCE, and was consequently killed during the fighting by a sniper.

References

Bibliography 

Ancient Chinese states
Zhou dynasty
States and territories disestablished in the 6th century BC
6th-century BC disestablishments
1st-millennium BC disestablishments in China
History of Anhui